Children of a Lesser God is a play by Mark Medoff, focusing on the conflicted professional and romantic relationship between Sarah Norman, a deaf student, and her former teacher, James Leeds. It premiered at the Mark Taper Forum in 1979, was produced on Broadway in 1980 and in the West End in 1981. It won the 1980 Tony Award for Best Play.

Background
The play was specially written for the deaf actress Phyllis Frelich, based to some extent on her relationship with her husband Robert Steinberg. It was originally developed from workshops and showcased at New Mexico State University, with Frelich and Steinberg in the lead roles.  It was seen by Gordon Davidson, Director of the Mark Taper Forum in Los Angeles, who insisted that the male role needed to be played by a more experienced professional actor. The title comes from Alfred, Lord Tennyson's Idylls of the King: "For why is all around us here / As if some lesser god had made the world".

Historical casting

Productions
Following a highly successful run at the Mark Taper Forum in Los Angeles, the Broadway production, directed by Gordon Davidson, opened on March 30, 1980, at the Longacre Theatre, where it ran for 887 performances. The cast included Phyllis Frelich as Sarah and John Rubinstein as James. David Ackroyd later replaced Rubinstein. Deaf actress Elizabeth Quinn later replaced Frelich, and Linda Bove, another deaf actress, known to television audiences for her more-than-30-year-long run on Sesame Street, had a successful turn in the role as well.

In 1981, the West End production ran originally at the Mermaid Theatre, then at the Albery Theatre, garnering three Olivier Awards.  The production starred Trevor Eve and Elizabeth Quinn.  Deaf actors from the UK were understudies including Jean St Clair, Sarah Scott and Terry Ruane.

A Broadway revival opened on April 11, 2018, at Studio 54, directed by Kenny Leon and starring Joshua Jackson, Lauren Ridloff, John McGinty and Anthony Edwards.

Film adaptation

In 1986, Medoff adapted the play for film directed by Randa Haines, starring Marlee Matlin and William Hurt.

Awards and nominations
Awards
 1980 Tony Award for Best Actor in a Play- John Rubinstein
 1980 Tony Award for Best Play
 1980 Drama Desk Award Outstanding Actor- John Rubinstein
 1980 Drama Desk Award Outstanding New Play
 1981 Laurence Olivier Award for Best New Play

Original Broadway production

Original West End production

2018 Broadway revival

References

External links
 

1980 plays
Broadway plays
Plays by Mark Medoff
Plays and musicals about disability
Deaf culture
Drama Desk Award-winning plays
Laurence Olivier Award-winning plays
Tony Award-winning plays
American plays adapted into films